Ivan Semyonovich Bylinsky (28 January 1903 in Gomel District – 10 May 1976) was a Belarusian communist politician. He served as the Chairman of the Council of Ministers of the Byelorussian Soviet Socialist Republic from 28 March 1940 to 6 February 1944. From 1944 until 1946, he served as the member of the Communist Party of Byelorussia. 

1903 births
1976 deaths
People from Gomel District
People from Gomelsky Uyezd
First convocation members of the Supreme Soviet of the Soviet Union
Second convocation members of the Supreme Soviet of the Soviet Union
Heads of government of the Byelorussian Soviet Socialist Republic
Recipients of the Order of Lenin
Recipients of the Order of the Red Banner
Recipients of the Order of the Red Banner of Labour
Members of the Central Committee of the Communist Party of Byelorussia
Members of the Supreme Soviet of the Byelorussian SSR (1938–1946)
Members of the Supreme Soviet of the Byelorussian SSR (1951–1954)
People's commissars and ministers of the Byelorussian Soviet Socialist Republic